Amy Diaz (born August 6, 1984) is an American actress, model and beauty pageant titleholder who competed in the Miss USA 2008 and Miss Earth United States 2009. She is from Providence, Rhode Island. Diaz, along with her husband Jason Case, won the twenty-third installment of the U.S. reality television show The Amazing Race.

Background
Diaz attended Classical High School in Providence, Rhode Island. She is of Dominican descent.

She graduated cum laude with a Bachelor of Arts in Broadcast Communication with a Minor in Psychology from Barry University. In May 2007 she completed dual master's degrees in Business Administration and Sport Management there. She is a nationally recognized President and Founding Sister of the Iota Theta chapter of Phi Sigma Sigma sorority and was the recipient of several leadership awards including: Graduate Assistant of the Year, Greek Organization President of the Year, Residential Life Hall Staff of the Year, and National Broadcasting Society Outstanding Member of the Year.

Diaz was a co-host of "Social Women", a Rhode Island's talk-show and entertainment program.

In 2013, Diaz was nominated for The Leukemia & Lymphoma Society Man & Woman of the Year Award, and she raised close to $10,000 in a 10-week period to help cure leukemia, lymphoma, Hodgkin's disease and myeloma, and improve the quality of life of patients and their families. She has worked in media and production since 1999, and has been a Screen Actors Guild (SAG) member since 2000. She was also employed as the first personal assistant to tennis champion, Venus Williams.

Television career
She competed on the 23rd season of The Amazing Race with her boyfriend, Jason Case. After having six second-place finishes overall, she and her partner Jason won the one million dollar grand prize and the and Amazing Race 23 title over exes Tim & Marie and married ER doctors Nicole & Travis.

Beauty pageant

Miss Rhode Island Teen USA
Diaz won her first notable pageant title in 2001 when she was crowned Miss Rhode Island Teen USA 2001. She represented Rhode Island in the Miss Teen USA 2001 pageant held in South Padre Island, Texas in August 2001.

Miss Rhode Island USA 
In September 2007, Diaz won the Miss Rhode Island USA 2008 title in a state pageant held in Providence. This was Diaz's first attempt at the Rhode Island title, although she placed third runner-up at Miss Florida USA 2007. Diaz is the first Miss Teen USA delegate to win a Miss USA 2008 state title.

Miss USA
She competed in the Miss USA 2008 pageant held in Las Vegas, Nevada and placed in the top 15.

Miss Earth 2009
Diaz won the crown and title of Miss Earth United States 2009 on July 22, 2009. She represented the United States in the 9th edition of Miss Earth beauty pageant, which was held at the Boracay Ecovillage Resort and Convention Center, in the Island of Boracay, Philippines, which started on November 1, 2009, and concluded on November 22, 2009. The Miss Earth winner serves as the spokesperson for the Miss Earth Foundation, the United Nations Environment Programme (UNEP) and other environmental organizations. There were 80 delegates from different countries and territories competed in the event.

Miss Tourism Intercontinental 2010
She competed in the 2010 pageant held in Miri, Sarawak, Malaysia on May 20. She placed 2nd runner-up.

See also

References

External links
 Miss Earth official website
 Miss Earth United States official website
 Miss Rhode Island USA official website
 The Amazing Race
 "Southern California Latinas of Influence Recognized by Hispanic Lifestyle Television"

1984 births
Barry University alumni
Living people
Miss USA 2008 delegates
Actors from Providence, Rhode Island
2001 beauty pageant contestants
21st-century Miss Teen USA delegates
Miss Earth 2009 contestants
Miss Earth United States delegates
The Amazing Race (American TV series) contestants
Actresses from Rhode Island
Reality show winners
Classical High School alumni